Bakari is both a given name and a surname of African origin. 

Notable people with the given name include:
Bakari Fofana (born 1962), Malian footballer 
Bakari Grant (born 1987), Canadian football player
Bakari Hendrix (born 1977), American basketball player
Michael Bakari Jordan (born 1987), American actor
Bakari Koné (born 1981), Ivorian footballer
Bakari Sellers (born 1984), American attorney, politician and commentator

Notable people with the surname include:
Bahia Bakari (born 1996), French airplane crash survivor
Dagui Bakari (born 1974), French-Ivorian footballer
Grace Bakari (born 1954), Ghanaian sprinter
Nurdin Bakari (born 1988), Tanzanian footballer 
Oumar Bakari (born 1980), French footballer
Saïd Bakari (born 1994), French-Comorian footballer
Tareq Bakari (born 1988), Moroccan writer

See also 
 Bakary
 Bakare

Given names